Sir Antony James Cobham Edwards-Stuart (born 2 November 1946) is a retired judge of the High Court of England and Wales.

Education
He was educated at Sherborne School, the Royal Military Academy Sandhurst and St Catharine's College, Cambridge.

Career
Edwards-Stuart was called to the bar at Gray's Inn in 1976 and became a bencher there in 2009. He was appointed QC in 1991, recorder in from 1997, deputy judge of the High Court in 2003, and judge of the High Court of Justice (Queen's Bench Division) in 2009. He was Judge in Charge of the Technology and Construction Court from September 2013 until his mandatory retirement upon reaching the age of 70 in November 2016.

References

1946 births
Living people
People educated at Sherborne School
Alumni of St Catharine's College, Cambridge
Members of Gray's Inn
Queen's Bench Division judges
Knights Bachelor